The word oral may refer to:

Relating to the mouth
 Relating to the mouth, the first portion of the alimentary canal that primarily receives food and liquid
Oral administration of medicines
 Oral examination (also known as an oral exam or oral test), a practice in many schools and disciplines in which an examiner poses questions to the student in spoken form
 Oral hygiene, practices involved in cleaning the mouth and preventing disease
Oral medication
Oral rehydration therapy, a simple treatment for dehydration associated with diarrhea
Oral sex, sexual activity involving the stimulation of genitalia by use of the mouth, tongue, teeth or throat.
Oral stage, a human development phase in Freudian developmental psychology
Oral tradition, cultural material and tradition transmitted orally from one generation to another
Oralism, the education of deaf students through oral language by using lip reading, and mimicking of mouth shapes and breathing patterns
Speech communication, also known as oral communication or verbal communication, as opposed to writing

Places
 Oral, Kazakhstan, a city
 Oral, South Dakota, United States
 Royaume d'Oral, 18th-century French name for the Principality of Bethio on the Senegal River in West Africa

People 
 Oral Jacobs (1911-1995), American politician
 Oral Roberts (1918–2009), American televangelist
 Oral Roberts University, named after the televangelist
 Oral P. Tuttle (1889–1957), American lawyer and politician

See also
 Aural
 Ora (disambiguation)
 Orel (disambiguation)
 Ural (disambiguation)